The Liceo Italiano Statale Istanbul or the Istituti Medi Italiani (I.M.I.), popularly known as Liceo Italiano in Italian and İtalyan Lisesi in Turkish, is under legislation a private school which is situated in Beyoğlu, Istanbul, Turkey. Although considered a private school under Turkish law, the Liceo Italiano receives financial support and teachers from Italy.

It is owned by the Italian government.

History
It was founded in 1888.

Notable alumni
 Can Yaman, Actor
 Ayşecan Tatari, Actress
 Çağla Kubat, European Slalom Windsurf Champion, Model, Miss Turkey 2002 The First Runner-up 
 Ergin Ataman, Basketball Coach
 Giovanni Scognamillo, Writer
 Hazal Kaya, Actress
 Jaklin Çarkçı, Opera Singer
 Kudsi Ergüner, Ney Performer
 Leyla Gencer, Opera Singer
 Prof. Dr. Emre Öztürk, Botanist
 Mehmet Günsür, Actor
 Nilüfer Yumlu, Singer
 Özlem Kaymaz, Model, Miss Turkey 1992
 Parla Şenol, Actress
 Rüya Sünder, Pianist
 Selami Münir Yurdatap, Writer
 Sema Çeyrekbaş, Opera Singer 
 Dr. Sedat Bornovalı, Art Historian
 Üstün Akmen, Theater Critic, Writer
 Vural Gökçaylı, Fashion Designer
 Yiğit Giray, Actor, Singer
 Zeynep Casalini, Actress, Singer
 Barış Tunalı, Researcher and Scientific Book Writer
Cemran Seyhun Biricik, Teacher/First Woman Coach for a High School Male Soccer Team in NJ USA

See also

 List of missionary schools in Turkey
 List of high schools in Turkey
 Education in the Ottoman Empire

References

External links
 Italian lisesi official website
 The school's Alumni Association website

High schools in Istanbul
Italian international schools in Europe
International schools in Turkey
Educational institutions established in 1888
Beyoğlu
1888 establishments in the Ottoman Empire